The Communist Party of Khorezm was a political party in the final months of the Khanate of Khiva, and after 26 April 1920 the Khorezm People's Soviet Republic/Khorezm Socialist Soviet Republic.

In 1922, the party became affiliated to the Russian Communist Party (Bolsheviks). During the spring of 1924, when proposals for reorganization of Soviet Central Asia were discussed the leadership of the Communist Party of Khorezm declined to take any firm position on the issue. Only in July the same year did the party formally approve of the plans to form Soviet republics on nationality-based boundaries. The official Soviet histography at the time claimed that the Communist Party of Khorezm had been a nest of "bourgeois-and-nationalistic and Trotskyist elements, who hampered the forming of new Republics". Later, in 1924, the party was dissolved as the boundaries of Soviet Central Asia were redrawn, with the Khorezm SSR being split between the Uzbek and Turkmen SSRs and the Karakalpak Autonomous Oblast.

First Secretaries of the Party
There were eight First Secretaries of the party during its four-year existence:
4 Apr – 3 Jun 1920: Alimdzhan Akchurin  
4 Jun 1920 – 6 Mar 1921: Mulla Dzhumaniyaz Sultanmuradov
29 May – 12 Nov 1921: Muhamedzhan Izetdinov
12 Nov – 17 Dec 1921: Berdi Gadzhiev
17 Dec 1921 – 22 Jul 1923: Gaifi Sharafutdinov
22 Jul – 22 Sep 1923: Ishchan Masharipov (acting)
22 Sep 1923 – 15 Jun 1924: Karimzhan Adinaev
15 Jun – 27 Oct 1924: Isak Hansuvarov

References

Khorezm
1920 establishments in Russia
1924 disestablishments in the Soviet Union
Communist parties in the Soviet Union
Parties of one-party systems
Political parties established in 1920
Political parties disestablished in 1924